Hiroto Shinohara is a Japanese karateka. He won the gold medal in the men's kumite 67 kg event at the 2014 Asian Games which was held in the Incheon, South Korea.

Career 

At the 2016 World Karate Championships held in Linz, Austria, he won the silver medal in the men's team kumite event.

In 2018, he competed in the men's kumite 67 kg event at the Asian Games held in the Jakarta, Indonesia without winning a medal.

At the 2019 Asian Karate Championships held in Tashkent, Uzbekistan, he won the gold medal in the men's kumite 67 kg event.

Achievements

References

External links 
 

Living people
Year of birth missing (living people)
Place of birth missing (living people)
Japanese male karateka
Karateka at the 2014 Asian Games
Karateka at the 2018 Asian Games
Medalists at the 2014 Asian Games
Asian Games medalists in karate
Asian Games gold medalists for Japan
21st-century Japanese people